Backusella australiensis is a species of zygote fungus in the order Mucorales. It was described by Andrew S. Urquhart and James K. Douch in 2020. The specific epithet refers to Australia, the country from which the type specimen was collected. The type locality is Morwell National Park.

See also
 
 Fungi of Australia

References

External links
 

Fungi described in 2020
Mucoraceae